Kristján Finnbogason (born 8 May 1971) is an Icelandic former footballer who played as a goalkeeper. He is best remembered for his time at Úrvalsdeild side KR.

Honours

Club

FH
Icelandic Premier Division: 2015, 2016

Grótta
Icelandic Second Division: 2009

ÍA
Icelandic Premier Division: 1992, 1993
Icelandic Cup: 1993

KR
Icelandic Premier Division: 1999, 2000, 2002, 2003
Icelandic Cup: 1994, 1995, 1999, 2008

References

1971 births
Living people
Kristjan Finnbogason
Kristjan Finnbogason
Kristjan Finnbogason
Kristjan Finnbogason
Ayr United F.C. players
Association football goalkeepers
Expatriate footballers in Scotland
Scottish Football League players
Kristjan Finnbogason
K.F.C. Lommel S.K. players
Kristjan Finnbogason
Kristjan Finnbogason